Hector Bremner is a Canadian politician, who served as a member of the Vancouver City Council in Vancouver, British Columbia from 2017 to 2018.

Early life
Born in Edmonton, Alberta, Bremner spent his early childhood years in Saskatoon, Saskatchewan. However, in the early 1990s, when Bremner was a young teenager, his home life became unstable and he "found himself couch-surfing with either his mom or his dad as they would stay with friends or move to different cities in search of opportunities," according to The Georgia Straight. His experience with homelessness led him to develop a personal concern for the issue of housing.

Career 
Bremner started his working life as a used car salesman on Vancouver Island. Bremner pursued a career in business development and operations management. In 2007 he founded the now-defunct TOUCH Marketing, and he served as vice-president of public affairs at Pace Group Communications.

He fundraised for the Canadian Olympic Committee, and served on the BC Children’s Hospital Foundation's 2017 A Night of Miracles Cabinet, as well as other not-for-profit causes.

Politics 
During the provincial elections of 2013, Bremner represented the BC Liberals in the riding of New Westminster, where NDP candidate Judy Darcy was ultimately elected. Following this, he was invited to join the provincial government as an executive assistant to B.C.'s then-Minister Responsible for Housing and Deputy Premier, Rich Coleman.

Non-Partisan Association 

In the 2017 Vancouver municipal by-election, the Non-Partisan Association selected Bremner to run for city council. He ran on a "Let's Fix Housing" platform directed at tackling affordability through increasing rental supply. Bremner was elected with 13,372 votes.

On February 19, 2018, it was announced that Bremner would be seeking the nomination for the position of mayor to represent the Non-Partisan Association during the 2018 Vancouver municipal election. Shortly after announcing his candidacy for the NPA mayoral nomination, Bremner faced issues by the Non-Partisan Association Board of Directors.  The NPA's Green Light Committee, which was charged with screening candidates, recommended approval of Hector Bremner's candidacy, but the board rejected this recommendation.

Yes Vancouver 
On 28 June 2018, Bremner announced that he would start a new political party, and call it "Yes Vancouver". Controversy surrounded the branding because "Yes Vancouver" was also the name of a local women's philanthropic group that had been around for over ten years. On 18 July, he revealed to The Georgia Straight that he would run for Mayor of Vancouver, with the aim of increasing the supply of housing in the city.  After Vancouver developer Peter Wall admitted he spent $85,000 on billboards for Bremner's mayoral campaign as a third party, Bremner's campaign could not contain the controversy.  In spite of raising $197,122.50 in declared donations, Bremner received less than 6% of the popular vote.

Electoral results

Results for MLA

Results for Vancouver City Council

Results for Vancouver Mayor

References

Non-Partisan Association councillors
Living people
British Columbia Liberal Party candidates in British Columbia provincial elections
Politicians from Edmonton
Year of birth missing (living people)